Péter Várhidi (born 8 May 1958 in Budapest, Hungary) is a Hungarian football coach who was national coach of the national team.

Career
As a player, he spent most of his career at Újpesti Dózsa as a defender, but never played in the Nemzeti Bajnokság I. Over the age 20 he moved to BVSC, where he played a few 1st division matches.

Coaching career
He became the head coach of Újpest FC in 1997 and became Hungarian champion with the team in his first season. He worked with the team until 2000. Later he was a coach at FC Fehérvár.

From 2006 to 2008 he was the coach of the Hungarian national team and was on 26 November 2009 named as Head Coach of Pécsi Mecsek FC.

Honours
Manager of the Year in Hungary: 2007

Personal life
His father, Pál Várhidi was also a successful player and coach.

References

1958 births
Hungarian footballers
Hungarian football managers
Hungary national football team managers
Újpest FC players
Fehérvár FC managers
Újpest FC managers
Living people
Association football defenders
Pécsi MFC managers
Nemzeti Bajnokság I managers
Footballers from Budapest